Books about and authored by Jimmy Carter, the 39th president of the United States (1977–1981).

Books and scholarly articles about Carter 

 
 
 
 
 
 
 
 
 
 Carleton, David, and Michael Stohl. "The foreign policy of human rights: Rhetoric and reality from Jimmy Carter to Ronald Reagan." Human Rights Quarterly 7 (1985): 205–229 online.
 
 
 
 
 
 
 Glad, Betty. An outsider in the White House: Jimmy Carter, his advisors, and the making of American foreign policy (Cornell University Press, 2009).
 
 
 
 Green, Michael J. By more than providence: Grand strategy and American power in the Asia Pacific since 1783 (Columbia UP, 2017)  pp 363–386. online
 
 
 
 
 
 
 Kaufman, Diane, and Scott Kaufman. Historical Dictionary of the Carter Era (Scarecrow, 2013) 301 pp
 
 
 
 
 
 
 
 
 
 Rosenbaum, Herbert D. and Alexej Ugrinsky, eds. Jimmy Carter: Foreign Policy and Post-Presidential Years (1994) 532pp; essays by experts  online, 532pp
 Rosenbaum, Herbert D. and Alexej Ugrinsky, eds. The Presidency and Domestic Policies of Jimmy Carter (1994) 876pp; essays by experts online
 Sarantakes, Nicholas Evan. Dropping the torch: Jimmy Carter, the Olympic boycott, and the Cold War (Cambridge University Press, 2010).
 
 
 
 
 
 
 
 
 Williams, Daniel K. The Election of the Evangelical: Jimmy Carter, Gerald Ford, and the Presidential Contest of 1976 (University Press of Kansas, 2020) online review

Books by Carter 
 
 
 Carter, Jimmy. Public Papers of the Presidents of the United States: Jimmy Carter, 1977 (1978–1981); annual compilation of all his public documents
 
 
 
 
 
 
 
 
 
 
 
 
 
 
 
  A historical novel about the American Revolution, and the first work of fiction written by a U.S. President.
 
  Won a Grammy Award for best spoken-word album.
  UK edition of Our Endangered Values.

Memoirs

Reviews 
 Kantowicz, Edward R. "Reminiscences of a Fated Presidency: Themes from the Carter Memoirs". Presidential Studies Quarterly 15#4 1986, pp. 651–665. .
 Lafeber, Walter. "From confusion to Cold War: The memoirs of the Carter administration". Diplomatic History 8.1 (1984): 1–12 .
 Thomas, Norman C. "The Carter Administration Memoirs: A Review Essay". Western Political Quarterly 39.2 (1986): 348–360. .

List 
 Brzeziński, Zbigniew. Power and Principle: Memoirs of the National Security Adviser, 1977–1981 (1983)
 Califano, Joseph A. Jr. Governing America (1981) online
 
 Carter, Jimmy. Keeping Faith: Memoirs of a President (U of Arkansas Press, 1995). online
 Carter, Jimmy. White House Diary (2011) online
 Carter, Jimmy. Public Papers of the Presidents of the United States: Jimmy Carter, 1977 (1978); annual online
 Carter, Rosalynn. First Lady from Plains (1985) online
 Jordan, Hamilton. Crisis: The Last Year of the Carter Presidency (1982) online.
 Lance, Bert. The Truth of the Matter: My Life In and Out of Politics (1991). online
 Mondale, Walter. The Good Fight: A Life in Liberal Politics (2010) online
 O'Neill, Tip Jr., and William Novak. Man of the House: The Life and Political Memoirs of Speaker Tip O'Neill (1987) online.
 Powell, Jody. The Other Side of the Story (1984). online
 Thompson, Kenneth W., ed. The Carter Presidency: Fourteen Intimate Perspectives of Jimmy Carter (1990).
 Vance, Cyrus. Hard Choices: Four Critical Years in Managing America's Foreign Policy (1983) online.

References

External links 

 

Bibliographies by writer
Bibliographies of American writers
Bibliographies of presidents of the United States
 
Bibliography
Jimmy Carter-related lists